Ahmed Abo Obaid  (born November 6, 1984) is a Saudi football player who plays as a winger.

References

1984 births
Living people
Saudi Arabian footballers
Al-Fateh SC players
Ittihad FC players
Al-Raed FC players
Al Safa FC players
Al-Nojoom FC players
Place of birth missing (living people)
Saudi First Division League players
Saudi Professional League players
Saudi Second Division players
Association football wingers
Saudi Arabian Shia Muslims